Md. Shahadat Hossain is a Bangladeshi actor and radio personality who acted in stage, television and films. He won National Film Award 2017 in Best Supporting Actor category for Gohin Baluchor.

Early life and education
Hossain was born on 9 November 1976 in Barisal. He passed SSC and HSC from Khulna. He completed his graduation in political science. He also completed MBA major in Human Resource Management.

Career
Hossain acted in stage during his school life. He joined Center for Asian Theatre in 1997. His made his debut in television drama in 2005. He played the role of Bahadur in Sisimpur. He won Lux RTV Star Awards 2016 in the Best Actor in Single Episode Drama and Telefilm category.

Hossain also acted in films. Under Construction is his debut film. Sutopar Thikana is his first released film. Sutopar Thikana was released on in 2015. His film Under Construction was released 2016. His film Ekattorer Nishan was also released in 2016.

Hossain's film Nuru Mia O Tar Beauty Driver was released in 2017. His film Gohin Baluchor was also released in 2017. He won National Film Award 2017 in Best Supporting Actor category for this film. He worked in a short film titled Performer in 2019.

Besides films Hossain worked in Navana Group more than one years. He joined there in 2001. He also worked as a radio jockey in ABC Radio. He worked there in Behal Chourasta.

Personal life
Hossain married to Farzana Rahman Rita in 2007.

Selected stage dramas
 Velua Sundori
 Peer Gynt
 Raja
 The Lady from the Sea
 Eksho Bosta Chal
 The Communicator
 Dog, Women, Man
 Ontorale Itihas
 Stalin

Selected television dramas and telefilms
 Sisimpur
 Swapnavukh
 Mithya Tumi Dosh Pipra
 Sobuj Nokhkhotro
 Kopthe Mon
 Jodi Nirbashan Daw
 Jononi
 Akjon Bikkhato Bektir Mrittur Por
 Pinjor
 Sonali Megher Valobasa
 Kingkortobyo Bimukh
 Ghorar Chal Arai Ghor
 Ebong
 Shunyata
 Mon Tar Shangkhini
 Amaro Porano Jaha Chay
 Pagla Ghonta
 Premer Satkahon
 Ekti Dotola Barir Golpo
 Rakhkhusi
 Pochattorer Diary
 Ba te Bandhu(Season 1)
 Ba te Bandhur Hutoputi(Season 2)

Filmography

| 2021
| Dhaka Dream

Awards and nominations

References

External links
 

Living people
Bangladeshi male film actors
Best Supporting Actor National Film Award (Bangladesh) winners
1976 births
People from Khulna District
Bangladeshi male television actors
Bangladeshi radio personalities
National University, Bangladesh alumni
Bangladeshi male stage actors